George Esslemont Gordon Leith (1885–1965) was a South African architect.

Career
He started his career working for Herbert Baker.

Leith served as a captain in the Royal Field Artillery (and was later recovering from a Western Front gas attack).

Leith was assistant architect to the Imperial War Graves Commission in England from 1918 to 1920, before going back to South Africa, where he set up his own practice.

Leith's  works include the Calais Southern War Cemetery, France (1918–20), Johannesburg Park Station (1927–32), the Town Hall, Bloemfontein (1920–40), the South African Reserve Bank, Johannesburg (1938), and the Queen Victoria Hospital, Johannesburg (1943).

Personal life
He married Ethel Mary Leith, née Cox (1888–1974). Their daughter Sarah Greenaway Leith (1918-2010), was a British rally driver and novelist, and a Second World War codebreaker at Bletchley Park.

References

1885 births
1965 deaths
20th-century South African architects